84th NBR Awards
Best Film: 
Zero Dark Thirty

The 84th National Board of Review Awards, honoring the best in film for 2012, were held on January 8, 2013.

Top 10 Films
Films listed alphabetically except top, which is ranked as Best Film of the Year:

Zero Dark Thirty
Argo
Beasts of the Southern Wild
Django Unchained
Les Misérables
Lincoln
Looper
The Perks of Being a Wallflower
Promised Land
Silver Linings Playbook

Top Foreign Films 
Barbara
The Intouchables
The Kid with a Bike
No
War Witch

Top Documentaries 
Ai Weiwei: Never Sorry
Detropia
The Gatekeepers
The Invisible War
Only the Young

Top Independent Films 
Arbitrage
Bernie
Compliance
End of Watch
Hello I Must Be Going
Little Birds
Moonrise Kingdom
On the Road
Quartet
Sleepwalk with Me

Winners

Best Film:
Zero Dark Thirty

Best Director:
Kathryn Bigelow, Zero Dark Thirty

Best Actor:
Bradley Cooper, Silver Linings Playbook

Best Actress:
Jessica Chastain, Zero Dark Thirty

Best Supporting Actor:
Leonardo DiCaprio, Django Unchained

Best Supporting Actress:
Ann Dowd, Compliance

Best Original Screenplay:
Rian Johnson, Looper

Best Adapted Screenplay:
David O. Russell, Silver Linings Playbook

Best Animated Feature:
Wreck-It Ralph

Special Achievement in Filmmaking:
Ben Affleck, Argo

Breakthrough Actor:
Tom Holland, The Impossible

Breakthrough Actress:
Quvenzhané Wallis, Beasts of the Southern Wild

Best Directorial Debut:
Benh Zeitlin, Beasts of the Southern Wild

Best Foreign Language Film:
Amour

Best Documentary:
Searching for Sugar Man

William K. Everson Film History Award:
50 Years of Bond Films

Best Ensemble:
Les Misérables

Spotlight Award:
John Goodman, for Argo, Flight, ParaNorman, Trouble with the Curve

NBR Freedom of Expression:
The Central Park Five
Promised Land

National Board of Review Awards
2012 film awards
2012 in American cinema